Cynthia Cranz is an American voice actress who works for anime series at Funimation, Sound Cadence Studios, and OkraTron 5000. She is best known as the teenage adult voice of Chi-Chi in the Dragon Ball series,  Botan in Yu Yu Hakusho, Pipimi in Pop Team Epic from Ep. 11A, Mitzi Nohara in Shin-chan, and Mitch Tennison in Case Closed.

Filmography

Anime
 Ace Attorney - Sister Bikini (Season 2)
 Aria the Scarlet Ammo - Landlady (Ep. 13 OVA)
 B Gata H Kei - Ms. Akai
 B't X - Karin, Gaku, Hokuto's Mother (Neo)
 Barakamon - Emi Handa (Handa-kun spin-off series)
 Bamboo Blade - Kirino's Mother (Ep. 16)
 BECK: Mongolian Chop Squad - Koyuki's Mother
 Beet the Vandel Buster - Arin
 Big Windup! - Maria Momoe
 Birdy the Mighty: Decode 02 - Takumi (Ep. 3)
 Black Blood Brothers - Sayuka Shiramine (EP. 6)
 Boogiepop and Others - Makiko’s Mom (Ep. 11)
 Case Closed - Mitch Tennison, various
 A Certain Scientific Railgun series - Head Resident
 Chain Chronicle -The Light of Haecceitas- - Dilma (Ep. 4)
 Chio's School Road - Momo's Homeroom Teacher
 Citrus - Mineko Fuji
 City Hunter: Shinjuku Private Eyes - Ai's Mother
 Corpse Princess - Rika Aragami
 D.Gray-man - Sarah (Ep. 29-30)
 Darker than Black - Shizuka Isozaki (EP. 19-20)
 Date A Live III - Shiizaki
 Deadman Wonderland OVA - Hinata Mukai
 The Devil Is a Part-Timer! - Miki Shiba
 Dr. Stone - Alumi
 Dragon Ball - Chi-Chi (Teen), various
 Dragon Ball Z - Chi-Chi (Teen/Adult), various (as well as Kai series)
 Dragon Ball GT - Chi-Chi
 Dragon Ball Super - Chi-Chi, various
 Dragonar Academy - Frieda Shelley
 Dragonaut - The Resonance - Shelly (Ep. 6-8)
 Eden of the East - Misae (Ep. 3)
 Fafner in the Azure: Heaven and Earth - Yumiko Hino
 Fruits Basket series - Tohru's Aunt, Kisa's Mother, Mii, Mitsuru (2019 series)
 Fullmetal Alchemist series - Paninya
 The Galaxy Railways - Liza (Ep. 10), Ine (Ep. 12)
 Ghost Hunt - Noriko Morishita (Ep. 4-6)
 Ghost in the Shell: Arise - Yoko Kitahara
 Glass Fleet - Muscat
 Gonna be the Twin-Tail!! - Emu Shindo
 Gunslinger Girl series - Ferro
 Heaven's Lost Property - Sohara's Mother
 Hell Girl - Yuko (Ep. 11), Ryoko's Mother (Ep. 2)
 High School DxD - Mira
 Karneval - Nima
 Kaze no Stigma - Toru (Ep. 7)
 Kenichi: The Mightiest Disciple - Saori Shirahama
 Kiddy Grade - Marianne
 King of Thorn - Mallory Bridge
 Kodocha - Hisae Kumagai
 Linebarrels of Iron - Chisato Hayase
 Lupin III: The Pursuit of Harimao's Treasure - Diana
 Maria the Virgin Witch - Bonne (Ep. 1-2, 6-9)
 Michiko & Hatchin - Joanna Belenbauza Yamada (Hana's Foster Mother, Ep. 1)
 Mushishi - Biki's Mother (Ep. 2), Saku (Ep. 11)
 Negima! series - Kū Fei
 No-Rin - Hisako Nakazawa
 Nobunagun - Ogura's Mother
 Ōkami-san and her Seven Companions - Ringo's Mother (Ep. 9)
 One Piece - Bellemère, various
 Peach Girl - Etsuko, Suzu
 Phantom: Requiem for the Phantom - Kelly Reynolds (Ep. 4)
 Ping Pong: The Animation - Emiko (Eps. 7, 10)
 Pop Team Epic - Pipimi (Ep. 11a), Daichi's Mother (Ep. 1)
 Princess Jellyfish - Chieko
 Puzzle & Dragons X - Sidonia
 Rideback - Kei Yoda
 Rin ~Daughters of Mnemosyne - Yoko Todoroki
 Romeo x Juliet - Benvolio's Mother, Hermione's Mother
 Rosario + Vampire Capu2 - Tsurara Shirayuki (Mizore's Mother)
 The Sacred Blacksmith - Justina Albright
 Sakura Quest - Masami Nunobe (Ep. 12-13)
 Save Me! Lollipop - School Nurse (Ep. 9)
 School Rumble - Hanai's Mother (Ep. 13)
 Shiki - Nao Yasumori
 Shin-chan (Funimation dub) - Mitzi Nohara (Shin's Mother)
 Soul Eater - Lisa
 Space Dandy - Meow's Mother (Ep. 10)
 Spiral: The Bonds of Reasoning - Reiko Hatsuyama
 Star Blazers 2199 - Maki Kodai (Ep. 14)
 Summer Wars - Rika Jinnouchi
 Trinity Blood - Lilith Sahl (Ep. 24)
 Tsubasa: Reservoir Chronicle - Kurogane's Mother (Ep. 40), Suwa (Ep. 41)
 Tsukuyomi: Moon Phase - Shizuru (Hazuki's Mother)
 Valkyrie Drive: Mermaid - Torino Kazami
 Witchblade - Kyoko Sasaki (Ep. 24), Kei
 Yurikuma Arashi - Reia Tsubaki
 Yu Yu Hakusho - Botan

Video games
 Case Closed: The Mirapolis Investigation - Mitch Tennison
 Dragon Ball Z: Budokai - Chi-Chi
 Dragon Ball Z: Budokai 3 - Chi-Chi
 Dragon Ball Z: Budokai Tenkaichi 2 - Chi-Chi
 Dragon Ball Z: Budokai Tenkaichi 3 - Chi-Chi
 Dragon Ball Z: Harukanaru Densetsu - Chi-Chi
 Dragon Ball Z: Kakarot - Chi-Chi
 Monster Tale - Ethan
 Spikeout: Battle Street - Additional voices
 Super Dragon Ball Z - Chi-Chi
 Dragon Ball FighterZ - Chi-Chi
 Dragon Ball Legends - Chi-Chi
 Yu Yu Hakusho: Dark Tournament - Botan

References

External links

 
 
 
 

20th-century American actresses
21st-century American actresses
American video game actresses
American voice actresses
Living people
Actresses from Texas
University of Mississippi alumni
People from Grapevine, Texas
Year of birth missing (living people)